Nationality words link to articles with information on the nation's poetry or literature (for instance, Irish or France).

Events
 Frederick James Furnivall founds the Shelley Society
 September 18 – The "Symbolist Manifesto" (Le Symbolisme) is published in French newspaper Le Figaro by Greek-born poet Jean Moréas, who announces that Symbolism is hostile to "plain meanings, declamations, false sentimentality and matter-of-fact description," and that its goal instead is to "clothe the Ideal in a perceptible form" whose "goal was not in itself, but whose sole purpose was to express the Ideal"
 December 10 – American poet Emily Dickinson dies aged 55 of Bright's disease at the family home in Amherst, Massachusetts with fewer than a dozen of her poems published and is buried under the self-penned epitaph "Called Back". Following first publication of a collection of her poems in 1890, she will become regarded (with Walt Whitman) as one of the two quintessential nineteenth-century American poets

Works published in English

Canada
 Charles Mair, Tecumseh: A Drama, a closet drama in blank verse; published in Toronto.
 Charles G. D. Roberts, In Divers Tones. (Boston: Lothrop).

United Kingdom
 William Alexander, St. Augustine's Holiday, and Other Poems
 Rudyard Kipling, Departmental Ditties, and Other Verse
 Edith Nesbit, Lays and Legends, first series (see also second series 1892)
 Dante Gabriel Rossetti, Collected Works, posthumously published
 Alfred Lord Tennyson, Locksley Hall Sixty Years After
 William Butler Yeats, Mosada: A Dramatic Poem a short verse play in three scenes, published as a pamphlet of 100 copies paid for by his father (Yeats' first published work outside a journal), Irish poet published in the United Kingdom

United States
 Charles Follen Adams, Cut, Cut Behind!
 William Ellery Channing, John Brown and the Heroes of Harpers Ferry
 Celia Thaxter, Idyls and Pastorals
 Jones Very, Poems and Essays
 John Greenleaf Whittier, St. Gregory's Guest

Other in English
 William Butler Yeats, Mosada: A Dramatic Poem a short verse play in three scenes, published as a pamphlet of 100 copies paid for by his father (Yeats' first published work outside a journal), Irish poet published in the United Kingdom

Works published in other languages
 François Coppée, Poemes et recits; France
 Naim Frashëri, Bagëti e bujqësia ("Shepherds and Farmers"), Albania
 Jens Peter Jacobsen, Digte og Udkast ("Poems and Sketches"), Denmark, published posthumously (died 1885)
 Guido Mazzoni, Nuove poesie, Italy
 Charles G. D. Roberts, In Divers Tones, Canada

Awards and honors

Births
Death years link to the corresponding "[year] in poetry" article:
 January 1 – Kinoshita Rigen 木下利玄, pen-name of Kinoshita Toshiharu (died 1925), Japanese, Meiji- and Taishō-period tanka poet
 January 3 – John Gould Fletcher (died 1950), American Imagist poet, winner of the Pulitzer Prize for poetry
 February 2 – William Rose Benêt (died 1950), American poet, writer and editor; older brother of Stephen Vincent Benét
 February 11 – May Ziadeh (died 1941), Lebanese-Palestinian poet, essayist and translator
 February 13 – Ricardo Güiraldes (died 1927), Argentine gauchesque poet and author
 February 21 (February 9 O.S.) – Aleksei Kruchenykh (died 1968), Russian Futurist poet
 February 22 – Hugo Ball (died 1927), German poet and Dada artist
 March 30 – Frances Cornford (died 1960), English
 April 15 – Nikolay Gumilyov (executed 1921), Russian Acmeist poet
 May 7 – Gottfried Benn (died 1956), German essayist, novelist and expressionist poet
 May 15 – Helen Cruickshank (died 1975), Scottish
 May 16 – Vladislav Khodasevich (died 1939), Russian poet and critic
 May 20 – Chieko Takamura (died 1938), Japanese
 July – Misao Fujimura, 藤村操 (died 1903), Japanese philosophy student and poet, largely remembered for the poem he carves into a tree before committing suicide as a teenager over an unrequited love; the boy and the poem are sensationalized by Japanese newspapers after his death
 September 8 – Siegfried Sassoon (died 1967), English poet and author
 September 10 – Hilda Doolittle, aka H.D., (died 1961) American poet
 September 20 – Charles Williams (died 1945), English writer and poet, and a member of the loose literary circle called the Inklings
 October 8 – Yoshii Isamu 吉井勇 (died 1960), Japanese, Taishō and Shōwa period tanka poet and playwright
 October 12 – Abd Al-Rahman Shokry (died 1958), Egyptian poet, member of the Divan school of poetry
 October 24 – Delmira Agustini (died 1914), Uruguayan
 October 30 – Zoë Rumbold Akins (died 1958), American playwright, poet and author
 November 1 – Sakutarō Hagiwara 萩原 朔太郎 (died 1942), Japanese, Taishō and early Shōwa period literary critic and free-verse poet called the "father of modern colloquial poetry in Japan"
 December 6 – Joyce Kilmer (died 1918 in action near Seringes, France), American journalist and poet whose best-known work is "Trees" (1913)

Deaths

Birth years link to the corresponding "[year] in poetry" article:
 February 26 – Narmadashankar Dave, also known as "Narmad" (born 1833), Indian, Gujarati-language poet
 March 27 – Sir Henry Taylor (born 1800), English dramatist, poet and public official
 April 15 – Abram Joseph Ryan, American poet, active proponent of the Confederate States of America, and a Roman Catholic priest called the "Poet-Priest of the Confederacy"
 July 6 – Paul Hamilton Hayne, 56, American poet, critic, and editor
 August 11 (July 30 O.S.) – Lydia Koidula, 42, Estonian poet
 October 7 – William Barnes, 86, English writer, poet, minister, and philologist
 October 21 – José Hernández, 51, Argentine poet
 December 10 – Emily Dickinson, 55, American poet

See also
 19th century in poetry
 19th century in literature
 List of years in poetry
 List of years in literature

 Victorian literature
 French literature of the 19th century
 Symbolism (arts)
 Poetry

Notes

19th-century poetry
Poetry